Steffen Olsen (born 30 January 1983) is a Danish sport shooter.

He participated at the 2018 ISSF World Shooting Championships, winning a medal.

References

External links

Living people
1983 births
Danish male sport shooters
ISSF rifle shooters
Shooters at the 2015 European Games
Shooters at the 2019 European Games
European Games silver medalists for Denmark
European Games medalists in shooting
Shooters at the 2020 Summer Olympics
Olympic shooters of Denmark
21st-century Danish people